Macbeth is a French 1915 film adaptation of the William Shakespeare play Macbeth. It was released on December 31, 1915, in France. It is a silent black-and-white film with French intertitles.

Cast and crew
Séverin-Mars as Macbeth
Georgette Leblanc

References

Films based on Macbeth
1915 films
French silent short films
French black-and-white films
1910s French films